William Edwardes may refer to:
William Edwardes, 1st Baron Kensington, British peer and MP
William Edwardes, 2nd Baron Kensington, British peer and MP
William Edwardes, 3rd Baron Kensington, British peer and naval commander
William Edwardes, 4th Baron Kensington, British peer and Liberal politician

See also
William Edwards (disambiguation)